John Basil Fitzgerald OAM (born 28 December 1960) is a former professional tennis player from Australia who played right-handed with a single-handed backhand.

Playing career

During his career, he won 6 top-tier singles titles and 30 tour doubles titles, including 7 Grand Slam doubles titles. He also achieved the career men's doubles Grand Slam (winning all four titles-the Australian Open, French Open, Wimbledon and the US Open). He reached the World No. 1 doubles ranking in 1991, teaming up with Anders Järryd to win three out of the four Grand Slam doubles titles that year. His career-high singles ranking was World No. 25 in 1988. He was a member of the Australian team which won the Davis Cup in 1983 and 1986.

Post-playing career
Fitzgerald was formerly the captain of the Australian Davis Cup Team from 2001 to 2010 before Patrick Rafter took over after Australia's World group playoff loss to Belgium.

Honours
Fitzgerald was awarded the Medal of the Order of Australia in 1993.
On Australia Day in 2020, John was inducted into the Australian Tennis Hall of Fame.

Grand Slam finals

Doubles (7 titles, 4 runners-up)

Mixed doubles (2 titles, 4 runners-up)

References

External links 
 
 
 

1960 births
Living people
Australian expatriate sportspeople in the United States
Australian male tennis players
Australian Open (tennis) champions
Australian people of Irish descent
French Open champions
Sportspeople from Newport Beach, California
Recipients of the Medal of the Order of Australia
Tennis players from Melbourne
Tennis people from California
Tennis people from South Australia
US Open (tennis) champions
Wimbledon champions
Grand Slam (tennis) champions in mixed doubles
Grand Slam (tennis) champions in men's doubles
Olympic tennis players of Australia
Tennis players at the 1988 Summer Olympics
Tennis players at the 1992 Summer Olympics
People educated at Sacred Heart College, Adelaide
ATP number 1 ranked doubles tennis players
20th-century Australian people